Saint Clement is a census-designated place in Pike County, Missouri, United States, located on Route 161 approximately four miles south of Bowling Green.

The first settlement at St. Clement was made in 1870 by a colony of German Catholics. A post office called Saint Clement was established in 1870, and remained in operation until 1882.

Demographics

References

Census-designated places in Pike County, Missouri